Our Man in Havana is a 1959 British spy comedy film shot in CinemaScope, directed and produced by Carol Reed, and starring Alec Guinness, Burl Ives, Maureen O'Hara, Ralph Richardson, Noël Coward and Ernie Kovacs. The film is adapted from the 1958 novel Our Man in Havana by Graham Greene. The film takes the action of the novel and gives it a more comedic touch. The movie marks Reed's third collaboration with Greene.

Plot
In pre-revolutionary Cuba, James Wormold, a vacuum cleaner salesman, is recruited by Hawthorne of the British Secret Intelligence Service to be their Havana operative. Instead of recruiting his own agents, Wormold invents agents from men he knows only by sight and sketches "plans" for a rocket-launching pad based on vacuum cleaner parts to increase his value to the service and to procure more money for himself and his expensive daughter Milly.

Because his importance grows, he is sent a secretary, Beatrice, and a radioman from London to be under his command. With their arrival, it becomes much harder for Wormold to maintain his facade. However, all of his invented information begins to come true: his cables home are intercepted and believed to be true by enemy agents who then act against his "cell". One of his "agents" is killed, and he is targeted for assassination. He admits what he has done to his secretary, and he is recalled to London. At the film's conclusion, rather than telling the truth to the Prime Minister and other military intelligence services, Wormold's commanders (led by Ralph Richardson) agree to fabricate a story claiming his imagined machines had been dismantled. They bestow an OBE on Wormold and offer him a position teaching espionage classes in London.

Cast

 Alec Guinness as Jim Wormold 
 Burl Ives as Dr. Hasselbacher 
 Maureen O'Hara as Beatrice Severn 
 Ernie Kovacs as Captain Segura 
 Noël Coward as Hawthorne 
 Ralph Richardson as 'C' 
 Jo Morrow as Milly Wormold 
 Grégoire Aslan as Cifuentes
 Paul Rogers as Hubert Carter 
 Raymond Huntley as General 
 Ferdy Mayne as Professor Sanchez 
 Maurice Denham as Admiral 
 Joseph P. Mawra as Lopez
 Duncan Macrae as MacDougal 
 Gerik Schjelderup as Svenson 
 Hugh Manning as Officer 
 Karel Stepanek as Dr. Braun 
 Maxine Audley as Teresa
 Timothy Bateson as Rudy
 John Le Mesurier as Louis the Waiter

Production
The film was shot on location in Havana just two months after the overthrow of the Batista regime. Fidel Castro visited the film crew on 13 May 1959, while they shot scenes at Havana's Cathedral Square.

Reception
Our Man in Havana was positively received by film critics; it has a "fresh" rating of 95% (with 20 reviews) at the review aggregator website Rotten Tomatoes.

The film was nominated for the Golden Globe best picture (comedy or musical) award, and Reed was nominated for best director by the Directors Guild of America, losing both prizes to The Apartment.

Kine Weekly called it a "money maker" at the British box office in 1960.

References

External links
 
 
 
 

1959 films
1950s spy comedy films
British spy comedy films
British satirical films
Cold War spy films
British black-and-white films
Films set in Havana
Films shot in Cuba
Films directed by Carol Reed
Films based on works by Graham Greene
Films based on British novels
Films with screenplays by Graham Greene
1959 comedy films
Films about the Secret Intelligence Service
1950s English-language films
1950s British films